The Western Grain Transportation Act was a 1983 Canadian federal statute under which the formula for calculating a transport subsidy was modified. The subsidy, informally called the Crow Rate, Crow benefit or Crow subsidy, had been provided since 1897 by the Government of Canada to assist the rail transportation of specified grains and grain products to specified destinations within Canada for export. Since the producer paid only a portion of the freight rate, the Act had the effect of increasing the prices received by grain producers and paid by livestock producers on the prairies. The subsidy encouraged the movement of grain east and west to export shipping terminals.

The Act was abolished as part of budget balancing initiatives undertaken in 1995. Subsequently, grain began moving south for transhipment through the United States.

See also

 Rail transport in Canada
 List of Acts of Parliament of Canada

References

Rail freight transport in Canada
Canadian federal legislation
1983 in Canadian law
Grain trade